Daniel Patrick Quinn (born 26 February 1981) is a British musician, composer, producer, performer, author and creative thinking consultant.  Quinn founded the experimental Edinburgh-based record label Suilven Recordings (2003 – early 2006), which released his own works and that of postminimalist ambient American composers DAC Crowell and Kurt Doles, with whom Quinn also collaborated.

Early life
Quinn was born in Ipswich, England on 26 February 1981.

Career
Quinn's work is influenced from numerous genres, including European folk and folklore, pastoral ambient, punk and post-punk, minimalism, classical, spoken-word, jazz, world and avant-garde. His 2005 composition The Burryman, which includes narration by Duncan Grahl regarding the Scottish custom of the Burryman, was featured on the Sonic Arts Network compilation, curated by comedian and writer, Stewart Lee. Quinn founded the London-based group, One More Grain, and its second album, Isle of Grain, was released on 28 January 2008 by White Heat Records. The album was received critical acclaim and was granted the Sunday Times Album of the Week feature and received airplay on BBC Radio 1.

Quinn contributed to trumpeter Andrew Blick's solo project, Gyratory System. He was working on a new Afrobeat-inspired solo album, Acting The Rubber Pig, when he announced his retirement from music. Quinn cited the lack of substantial industry funding for the group as the primary reason for his retirement. A posthumous One More Grain 7" single of the traditional English song Scarborough Fair was released via Static Caravan in 2008.

Following the announcement of his retirement, Quinn moved to Jakarta, Indonesia, and oversaw "In Nem", a New York minimalist-inspired, gamelan recording project in Central Java. This was in addition to writing liner notes for Trance Gamelan in Bali. Quinn then became a writer and editor for an Indonesian volcano website, Gunung Bagging, which provides information on the peaks of the country with 1,000 metres topographic prominence, known as the Ribus.

Quinn moved back to the UK and settled in Stornoway. His EP, I, Sun, was released via Bandcamp in April 2016.

A compilation of rare and unreleased material was released in 2021 with the title Swirling In The Backyard. 

Currently Quinn is working as an author on hiking and creative thinking, and as a critical thinking and creative problem solving consultant. A fourth One More Grain album is due out in 2022 via Bandcamp.

Discography

Solo
The Winter Hills (Suilven Recordings) 2003
Jura (Suilven Recordings) 2003
Severed From The Land (Suilven Recordings) 2004
SUILVEN007 (with Beano Jameson) (Suilven Recordings) 2004
Ridin' The Stang (Suilven Recordings) 2005
Don't Look Down (with DAC Crowell and Kurt Doles) (Suilven Recordings) 2006
West to the Irish Sea (Wee Black Skelf, 10" compilation) 2007
Acting The Rubber Pig Redux 2014
I, Sun (EP) 2016
Signal Posts (EP) 2016

With One More Grain
Pigeon English (Victory Garden) 2007
Live in Brighton (Victory Garden / Static Caravan, 3" cd) 2007
Having A Ball (White Heat, 7" single) 2008
Isle of Grain (White Heat) 2008
Scarborough Fair b/w Giriama Wedding (Static Caravan, 7" single) 2008
Grain Fever (self-released) 2015
Swirling In The Backyard volume 2 / Sulawesi (self-released) 2021

Compilation appearances
Nine Standards Rigg on cover cd, issue 13 of Is this music? magazine 2005
TheFirstTen Suilven Recordings sampler (Suilven Recordings) 2005
The Burryman on Sonic Arts Network cd The Topography of Chance 2006
Figure of Eight - instrumental demo on cover cd, issue 1 of Plus One Lung photozine 2006
Tropical Mother-in-Law on free All Tomorrow's Parties cd 2007
A Drink With Bishop Berkeley (self-released) 2016
Swirling In The Backyard volume 1 / Laos (self-released) 2021

Books
The Dorset Ooser (Gunung.org) 2021
No What What (Gunung.org) 2021
All The Different Yous (Gunung.org) 2021
Gunung Nusantara (Gunung.org) 2021

References

External links
Gunung.org
Bandcamp
Interview on Whisperin' and Hollerin' by Tim Peacock
Interview on Mouvement Nouveau by Tobias Fischer
Ambient Music: Suilven Recordings

1981 births
Living people
English experimental musicians
English male singer-songwriters
21st-century English singers
21st-century British male singers